Jules Auguste Muraire (18 December 1883 – 20 September 1946), whose stage name was Raimu, was a French actor. He is most famous for playing César in the 'Marseilles trilogy' (Marius, Fanny and César).

Life and career
Born in Toulon in the Var department, Muraire made his stage debut there in 1899. After coming to the attention of the great music hall star Félix Mayol who was also from Toulon, in 1908 he was given a chance to work as a secondary act in the Paris theatre scene. He worked primarily in comedy. In 1916, writer/director Sacha Guitry gave him significant parts in productions at the Folies Bergère and other major venues. In addition to his appearances on stage, Raimu also developed a successful career in films, sometimes under the name Jules Raimu.

He starred in the premiere of André Messager's operetta Coups de roulis in 1928. The following year, already a leading actor, he gained wide acclaim for his starring role in the stage production of the Marcel Pagnol play Marius. Reluctantly, owing to his disappointment with his first film role many years earlier, he agreed to act in Guitry's film Le Blanc et le Noir and then reprised his Marius role on film a year later. By his late forties Raimu had become one of his country's most respected actors, and was considered the ultimate actor by Alec Guinness, Marlene Dietrich, and Orson Welles.

Family
He married Esther Metayer (1905-1977) in 1936. He had a daughter, Paulette Brun (1925-1992).

Death
Raimu died of a heart attack on 20 September 1946, brought on by complications with anesthesia after a relatively minor leg operation, in the American Hospital of Paris in Neuilly-sur-Seine, while he was asleep.

Legacy
He was interred in the cemetery of Toulon, where the Cinéma Raimu Toulon has been named in his honor.

In 1961, the government of France honored him with his image on a postage stamp. A small museum created by his granddaughter Isabelle Nohain exists in the town of Cogolin in the Var department in France.

Partial filmography

Black and White (1931) - Marcel Desnoyers
Marius (1931) - César Olivier
Mam'zelle Nitouche (1931) - Célestin / Floridor
The Chocolate Girl (1932) - Félicien Bédarride
Fun in the Barracks (1932) - Le capitaine Hurluret
Fanny (1932) - César
Théodore et Cie (1933) - Clodomir
Charlemagne (1933) - Charlemagne
Ces messieurs de la Santé (1934) - Gédéon Tafard
Minuit... place Pigalle (1934) - Monsieur Prosper
Tartarin de Tarascon (1934) - Tartarin
J'ai une idée (1934) - Aubrey
School for Coquettes (1935) - Labaume
Gaspard de Besse (1935) - Samplan
The Secret of Polichinelle (1936) - M. Jouvenel
The Brighton Twins (1936) - Alfred Beaugérard et les deux fils Achille
The King (1936) - M. Bourdier - un riche industriel et sénateur qui reçoit le Roi
César (1936) - César Ollivier
Let's Make a Dream (1936) - Le mari
Vous n'avez rien à déclarer? (1937) - Jules Papillot
The Pearls of the Crown (1937) - L'industriel du midi
 Chaste Susanne (1937) - Monsieur des Aubrays
Life Dances On (1937) - Francois Patusset
Gribouille (1937) - Camille Morestan
The Kings of Sport (1937) - Jules de l'Estaque
Le fauteuil 47 (1937) - Juste Auguste Theillard
The Strange Monsieur Victor (1938) - Victor Agardanne
Les nouveaux riches (1938) - Legendre
The Baker's Wife (1938) - Aimable Castanier
Heroes of the Marne (1938) - Bernard Lefrançois
Cocoanut (1939) - Loulou Barbentane
Monsieur Brotonneau (1939) - M. Brotonneau
Ultima giovinezza (1939) - Cesare
Second Childhood (1939) - Georges
The Man Who Seeks the Truth (1940) - Jean Vernet
La Fille du puisatier (1940) - Pascal Amoretti
Le duel (1941) - le Père Bolène
Parade en sept nuits (1941) - Le curé Maffre - curé des Baux
Les Inconnus dans la maison (1942) - Maître Hector Loursat
L'Arlésienne (1942) - Marc
Monsieur La Souris (1942) - Monsieur La Souris
The Benefactor (1942) - Monsieur Moulinet
Les petits riens (1942) - Charpillon
Untel père et fils (1943) - L'oncle Jules Froment
Le Colonel Chabert (1943) - Le colonel Hyacinthe Chabert
Les gueux au paradis (1946) - Boule
L'Homme au chapeau rond (1946) - Nicolas Trousotsky (final film role)
Chantons sous l'Occupation (1976) - (archive footage)

External links
 
 Raimu Museum

1883 births
1946 deaths
20th-century French male actors
Actors from Toulon
French male stage actors
French male film actors
French male silent film actors
Sociétaires of the Comédie-Française
César Honorary Award recipients